The 2021 SANFL Women's League season was the fifth season of the SANFL Women's League (SANFLW). The season commenced on 26 February and concluded with the Grand Final on 5 June. The competition is contested by eight clubs, all of whom are affiliated with clubs from the men's South Australian National Football League (SANFL).

Clubs

Ladder

Finals series

First semi-final

Second semi-final

Preliminary final

Grand Final

Awards

SANFL Women's Best and Fairest
 Lauren Young – 18 votes
Coaches Award
 Lauren Young – 52 votes
Leading Goal Kicker Award
 Chantel Reynolds – 14 goals
Leadership Award
 Maya Rigter

References

SANFL Women's League
SANFLW